Mono Ex Epafis (English: Contact Only) is the title of the fifth studio album by Greek singer Giorgos Sabanis, released on 4 November 2014 by Cobalt Music in Greece and Cyprus, written entirely by Giorgos Sabanis and Eleana Vrahali.

Track listing

Singles
"Poion Agapas"
"Poion Agapas"  was the first massive hit from the album, released on 9 June 2014 a digital single.  A music video for the song was released on 27 June 2014.
"Kaneis Den Xerei"
The second single from the album is "Kaneis Den Xerei", released to Greek radio stations on 20 October 2014. The video clip of the song was presented on 13 November 2014.
"Prin Peis S' Agapo"
The third single is "Prin Peis S' Agapo". The video clip of the song was released on 21 March 2015. In summer 2016, Giorgos Sabanis won award for "Best Video Clip Pop/Rock" with the song at the MAD Video Music Awards 2016.
"Mono Ex Epafis"
The fourth single  from the album is also the title of the album, "Mono Ex Epafis". The music video for the song was directed by Yiannis Papadakos.
"Argises Poli"
 The fifth single was released to Greek radio stations on 15 February 2016. The official music video was presented on 13 April 2016.

Release history

Charts
The album was number one in the Greek Albums Chart, it was certified Platinum on 17 December 2015.

Personnel

Soumka – executive producer, mixing
Paul Stefanidis –  mastering
Hristos Avdelas –  guitar, bass, drums
Dimitris Tsakoumis – creative director
Andreas and Nico – photography
Foxdesign – artwork
Akis Deiximos –  background vocals
Krida –  background vocals

References

Greek-language albums
2014 albums